Aqvital FC Csákvár is a Hungarian football club located in Csákvár, Hungary. It currently plays in Hungarian National Championship II. The team's colors are yellow and blue.

Current squad

References

External links 
  
 Magyarfuball

 
Football clubs in Hungary
Association football clubs established in 1947